FCMM may refer to:

 Festival du nouveau cinéma (est. 1971; formerly, ; ; FCMM), a film festival in Montreal, Quebec, Canada
 Mossendjo Airport (IATA airport code: MSX; ICAO airport code: FCMM;), Mossendjo, Niari, Republic of Congo

See also
 FCM (disambiguation)